Hunglish refers to any mixing of the English and Hungarian languages as a result of linguistic interference. This most often involves ungrammatical or awkward English expressions typical of Hungarian learners of English, as well as English words and phrases imported into the Hungarian language. The term is a portmanteau of Hungarian and English. The word is first recorded in 1978. The word is most popular in North England, especially in South Yorkshire.

As the prominence and influence of the English language in Hungary increases, Hunglish has also come to refer to the indirect effect of English on the modern-day Hungarian language. Some Hungarians believe this effect to be a negative one, claiming that English influence causes Hungarians to make grammatical, orthographic, and stylistic errors in their own mother tongue, and that traditional Hungarian expressions and terms are being crowded out by ones derived from English. Other Hungarians see this phenomenon as a natural process of linguistic interaction, and believe that features imported from English into Hungarian should be regarded as linguistic developments, rather than grammatical errors.

Examples in English 
Characteristic mistakes of Hungarians speaking English include:

 Use of verbs with inappropriate prepositional phrases (e.g. "I remember to him," "I need to food"). A wide variety of grammatical cases are used in Hungarian to express verb objects; these cases are then mistranslated based on common English translations in other contexts.
 Failure to capitalize proper nouns (e.g. "I have english class on monday"). Proper nouns are less frequently capitalized in Hungarian than in English.
 Omission of the word is (e.g. "My name Gabor").
 Ungrammatical use of reflexive pronouns (e.g. "I feel myself good" rather than "I feel good").
 Use of third-person pronouns in the wrong gender (e.g. "My mother bought himself a purse"). Hungarian has only one third-person pronoun, ő, used for both male and female genders.
 Failure to use the imperfect tense, which does not exist in Hungarian (e.g. "I slept when she arrived" rather than "I was sleeping when she arrived").
 Overuse of the definite article the (e.g. "the patience is a virtue" rather than "patience is a virtue").

Examples in Hungarian 

 The Hungarian word karakter traditionally means "personality," but is now often used as in English to mean "character" as in "the main character of the novel."
 Words which are capitalized in English but traditionally not in Hungarian, such as days of the week and nationalities, are increasingly capitalized in Hungarian as well.
 Idővonal, a calque of the English "timeline" is increasingly used in place of the more traditional words időrend and kronológia.
 Terms that are split into two words in English are increasingly also split in Hungarian, such as szoftver fejlesztő (software developer) in place of the more traditional szoftverfejlesztő.
 Egérpad is often used to mean "mouse pad," superseding the original term egéralátét (lit. "mouse underlay"). Some Hungarians object to this term because the Hungarian pad means "bench," and egérpad therefore literally translates to "mouse bench."

See also
Language interference
Mixed language

References 

Macaronic forms of English
Hungarian language